Park Chil-Sung (born 8 July 1982) is a South Korean race walker.

Competition record

References

External links

1982 births
Living people
South Korean male racewalkers
Athletes (track and field) at the 2004 Summer Olympics
Athletes (track and field) at the 2008 Summer Olympics
Athletes (track and field) at the 2012 Summer Olympics
Athletes (track and field) at the 2016 Summer Olympics
Olympic athletes of South Korea
Athletes (track and field) at the 2010 Asian Games
Athletes (track and field) at the 2014 Asian Games
Athletes (track and field) at the 2018 Asian Games
World Athletics Championships athletes for South Korea
Universiade medalists in athletics (track and field)
Asian Games medalists in athletics (track and field)
Asian Games silver medalists for South Korea
Medalists at the 2014 Asian Games
Universiade silver medalists for South Korea
21st-century South Korean people